Sardinas is a surname. Notable people with the surname include:

Alberto Sardiñas (born 1978), American author, radio personality, producer, and motivational speaker
Eric Sardinas (born 1970), American guitarist
Luis Sardiñas (born 1993), Venezuelan baseball player

See also
Sardina (disambiguation)